The longitudinal ligaments are two sets of ligaments that run along the spine.

These are:
 Anterior longitudinal ligament (ligamentum longitudinale anterius), which runs down the anterior surface of the spine
 Posterior longitudinal ligament (ligamentum longitudinale posterius), which is situated within the vertebral canal, and extends along the posterior surfaces of the bodies of the vertebrae